FC Columbus is a semi-professional American soccer club based in Upper Arlington, Ohio, a suburb of Columbus. The team is a member of the National Premier Soccer League (NPSL) and currently plays its home matches at The Wellington School.

History 
Initially founded in 1995 as the Santos Futbol Club of Columbus, a youth training academy, the team was announced on January 12, 2018 as a member of the NPSL ahead of the 2018 season. Maziya Chete, the team's owner and founder of Santos FC, was named the team's first associate head coach with Seymour Alleyne also taking an associate role.

During the first match of the against the Milwaukee Torrent on May 13, 2018, the local supporters affectionately nicknamed the club "The Saints" in honor of the link between the youth club TVSA Santos FC and FC Columbus. The game ended in a 2-2 draw with Damani Camara scoring the team's first goal in the 5th minute before scoring another in the 44th.

Despite not playing in the same conference, Columbus has a rivalry with fellow Ohio-based team Cleveland SC which also joined the NPSL in 2018. The two teams play yearly in early season friendlies, affectionately called the "CheeseBarn Derby" after the famous Grandpa's Cheesebarn & Sweeties Chocolates located between the two cities in Ashland, Ohio. As of 2020 both teams currently hold a win, each earning a 3-2 victory in 2018, and a draw (2019) with neither actually taking the advantage in the rivalry.

Year-by-year

References

National Premier Soccer League teams
Soccer clubs in Columbus, Ohio
Sports teams in Columbus, Ohio
Association football clubs established in 2018
2018 establishments in Ohio